Lawrence West may refer to:

Lawrence West (TTC), a station on the Yonge-University Spadina line of the subway system in Toronto, Canada
Lawrence West (rower) (born 1935), Canadian Olympic rower